The 2017–18 Quaid-e-Azam Trophy was the 60th edition of the Quaid-e-Azam Trophy, Pakistan's domestic first-class cricket competition. It was contested by 16 teams representing eight regional associations and eight departments, and took place from 26 September to 25 December 2017, spanning almost two weeks less than originally planned. Pakistan's former Test captain Misbah-ul-Haq was critical of the compressed schedule and the quality of the pitches saying "it takes time to prepare a good pitch for a game and nobody can make it in two days".

The format of the competition remained the same as the  previous season, with two round-robin group stages and a final. The regions and departments were divided evenly between the two groups for the preliminary group stage, with the four top teams in each advancing to a "Super Eight" group stage; the top team in each of the Super Eight groups contested the final. In a change from 2016–17, the Pakistan Cricket Board (PCB) introduced a draft system for the regional teams.

 beat defending champions  by 103 runs to win the Quaid-e-Azam Trophy for the third time in four years.

Draft
With the aim of improving the competitiveness of the regional associations, partly by distributing experienced players among them, proposals for the introduction of a draft system were presented to the PCB's governing board on 28 July 2017. The draft system gained approval after initial objections from some of the larger associations, led by Karachi, and a compromise was reached on the number of players to be selected via the draft. Each regional team selected eight players via the draft, ten through the normal selection process along with two emerging players from the under-19 circuit. The teams completed their player selection on 6 September 2017.

Competition summary
Faisalabad and  made their returns to first-class competition after winning the Quaid-e-Azam Trophy and Patron's Trophy Grade-II competitions respectively in 2016–17; they replaced the relegated  (PIA) and Karachi Blues in the competition. Like the previous season, both promoted teams enjoyed only a brief stay in the top-tier as they were relegated at the end of the season.

In Pool A, Sui Northern Gas Pipelines Limited, Sui Southern Gas Company, Lahore Blues and Water and Power Development Authority all progressed to the Super Eight section of the tournament. They were joined by United Bank Limited, Habib Bank Limited, Khan Research Laboratories and Lahore Whites from Pool B.

On 26 November 2017, the dates for the first round of the Super Eight fixtures were postponed by the PCB, due to ongoing religious unrest which had also disrupted the fixture schedule for the 2017–18 National T20 Cup. The Super Eight round was originally scheduled to start on 29 November 2017, but this was moved back to 3 December 2017.

Sui Northern Gas Pipelines Limited won Group 1 of the Super Eight round, beating Lahore Blues by six wickets to advance to the final. In the match, the first three innings were each completed without a side scoring three figures, the first time this had ever happened in the Quaid-e-Azam Trophy. Water and Power Development Authority won Group 2, despite losing to Sui Southern Gas Corporation by seven wickets in their final match.

In the final, Sui Northern Gas Pipelines Limited beat Water and Power Development Authority by 103 runs to win the competition for the third time in the last four years. Samiullah Khan was man of the match after he took his career-best bowling figures of 8 for 62 in the second innings and his 25th five-wicket haul in first-class cricket.

Teams
The following teams competed in the 2017–18 tournament:

Regional associations
 Faisalabad
 Federally Administered Tribal Areas
 Islamabad
 Karachi Whites
 Lahore Blues
 Lahore Whites
 Peshawar
 Rawalpindi

Departments
 Habib Bank Limited
 Khan Research Laboratories
 National Bank of Pakistan
 Pakistan Television
 Sui Northern Gas Pipelines Limited
 Sui Southern Gas Company
 United Bank Limited
 Water and Power Development Authority

Group stage

Tables

Results

Pool A

Round 1

Round 2

Round 3

Round 4

Round 5

Round 6

Round 7

Pool B

Round 1

Round 2

Round 3

Round 4

Round 5

Round 6

Round 7

Super Eight stage

Tables

Results

Group 1

Group 2

Final

Notes

References

External links
 Series home at ESPN Cricinfo

Domestic cricket competitions in 2017–18
2017 in Pakistani cricket
2017-18 Quaid-e-Azam Trophy
Pakistani cricket seasons from 2000–01